Brandsma is a Dutch surname. Notable people with the surname include:

Jacob Brandsma (1898–1976), Dutch rower
Jo Brandsma (1900–1973), Dutch rower
Titus Brandsma (1881–1942), Dutch Carmelite friar, Catholic priest, and professor of philosophy

Dutch-language surnames